Little Muddy Creek may refer to:
Little Muddy Creek (Conestoga River), in Lancaster County, Pennsylvania
Little Muddy Creek (Missouri River), a tributary of the Missouri River in the U.S. states of Montana and North Dakota
Little Muddy Creek (New Zealand)